Correcting a Mistake: Jews and Arabs in Palestine/Israel, 1936–1956 is a book by Israeli historian Benny Morris. 

Tikun Ta'ut is a collection of articles published in 2000 in Hebrew by Am Oved. One of the articles focuses on new evidence regarding Operation Hiram in the 1948 Arab–Israeli War: in a cable dated 31 October 1948 by Major General Moshe Carmel during the operation addressing all division and district commanders under his command is found the following: "Do all you can to immediately and quickly purge the conquered territories of all hostile elements in accordance with the orders issued. The residents should be helped to leave the areas that have been conquered".

According to Morris, his mistake was to believe what Carmel and others told him—that no deportation order was issued during Operation Hiram. Because of the cable mentioned above, he found himself obliged to correct his book The Birth of the Palestinian Refugee Problem, 1947-1948 with this article.

References

Books about the Arab–Israeli conflict
Am Oved books